In geometry, the bigyrate diminished rhombicosidodecahedron is one of the Johnson solids. It can be constructed as a rhombicosidodecahedron with two pentagonal cupolae rotated through 36 degrees, and a third pentagonal cupola removed. (None of the cupolae can be adjacent.)

External links
 

Johnson solids